Zora Tavčar (born 2 October 1928) is a Slovene writer, essayist and translator, living in Opicina (Slovenian: Opčine) in the suburbs of Trieste, Italy. She was
married to a notable member of the Slovene minority in Italy, writer Alojz Rebula.

Life
Tavčar was born in Loka pri Zidanem Mostu in 1928. She studied comparative literature, literary theory and Slovene language and literature at the University of Ljubljana. In 1963 she completed her doctorate at the Università Cattolica del Sacro Cuore in Milan.

In 1951, she married the Slovene writer and playwright Alojz Rebula and moved to Opicina (Opčine) near Trieste (Trst). Until her retirement in 1988, she taught at various secondary schools with Slovene as the language of instruction in the Trieste region.

Work
She started off with writing poetry, but is better known for her short stories, essays and radio plays.

Published works
 Veter v laseh (The Wind in My Hair), 1982
 Ob kresu življenja (At the Bonfire of Life), 1989
 Kroži, kroži galeb (Fly in Circles, Fly Seagull), 2008

References

Slovenian essayists
Slovenian translators
Living people
1928 births
University of Ljubljana alumni
Università Cattolica del Sacro Cuore alumni
People from the Municipality of Sevnica
Slovenian women essayists
20th-century Slovenian women writers
20th-century Slovenian writers
21st-century Slovenian women writers
21st-century Slovenian writers